The band-tailed hornero (Furnarius figulus), also known as wing-banded hornero or tail-banded hornero, is a species of bird in the family Furnariidae, the ovenbirds. It is endemic to Brazil.

Its natural habitats include a wide range of wooded habitats, especially near water and around mudflats. It feeds on insects, other arthropods, and shellfish – in short, any prey found by upturning stones and litter – and makes a cup-sized nest in sheltered places with grass and vegetal fibers.

Range
Wing-banded hornero exists in two ranges, separated by 1000 km, each population representing a subspecies. The largest range occurs in Atlantic northeastern and eastern Brazil, the Northeast Region, Brazil and Caatinga, as well as into continental regions inland, (part of the Cerrado). In recent years, this population has expanded southwards at least as far as São Paulo. The second population ranges upstream in a strip along the Amazon River for about 1700 km as well as southwards to the upstream reaches of the Araguaia River in the adjacent Tocantins-Araguaia River drainage. This southerly strip ranges between two river systems in a strip approximately 2400 km long; the western portion is the downstream half of the Xingu River.

References

External links
"Furnarius figulus"--Wing-banded hornero videos on the Internet Bird Collection
Wing-banded hornero photo gallery VIREO Photo-High Res
"Furnarius figulus"--Photo; Article & species Synopsis and relationships arthurgrosset Photo-2--Medium Res
Caatinga-Regional Map 

band-tailed hornero
Birds of Brazil
Birds of the Caatinga
Birds of the Amazon Basin
Endemic birds of Brazil
band-tailed hornero
Taxonomy articles created by Polbot